Ha Hang is a village in Tai Po District, Hong Kong.

Administration
Ha Hang is a recognized village under the New Territories Small House Policy. It is one of the villages represented within the Tai Po Rural Committee. For electoral purposes, Ha Hang is part of the Hong Lok Yuen constituency, which was formerly represented by Zero Yiu Yeuk-sang until May 2021.

History
At the time of the 1911 census, the population of Ha Hang was 97. The number of males was 40.

See also
 Tai Po Industrial Estate

References

External links

 Delineation of area of existing village Ha Hang (Tai Po) for election of resident representative (2019 to 2022)
 Antiquities Advisory Board. Historic Building Appraisal. Lee Ancestral Hall, Ha Hang Pictures
 Antiquities Advisory Board. Historic Building Appraisal. Lee Ancestral Hall, No. 18 Ha Hang Pictures

Villages in Tai Po District, Hong Kong